Richard Law may refer to:

 Richard Law (judge) (1733–1806), American judge
 Richard Law, 1st Baron Coleraine (1901–1980), British politician
 Richard Law, 8th Baron Ellenborough (1926–2013), member of the House of Lords
 Rick Law (born 1969), illustrator